Hubert Bastianelli (14 June 1929 – 4 April 1991) was a French racing cyclist. He rode in the 1953 Tour de France.

References

1929 births
1991 deaths
French male cyclists
Place of birth missing